The Neuberger Committee was a committee set up to examine the law and practice surrounding super-injunctions in English law. It reported in May 2011.

References

English privacy law
2011 in England
Legal history of England